Mark Kennedy Shriver (born February 17, 1964) is an American Democratic politician who served as a member of the Maryland House of Delegates for two consecutive terms, from 1995 to 2003. Since 2014, he has served as President of Save the Children Action Network, where he leads an effort to mobilize Americans to end preventable maternal, newborn and child deaths globally and to ensure that every child in the U.S. has access to high-quality early childhood education. He is also Senior Vice President of U.S. Programs & Advocacy of Save the Children. Shriver's career fighting for social justice in advocacy and service organizations, as well as elected office, has focused on advancing the right of every child to a safe and vibrant childhood.

Background
Shriver was born at Georgetown University Hospital in Washington, D.C. He is part of the Kennedy political family, since his mother was Eunice Mary Kennedy. He may also be considered to be a part of the "Shriver political family", since his ancestor David Shriver was a delegate of Frederick County, Maryland who signed the Maryland Constitution and Bill of Rights at Maryland's Constitutional Convention of 1776. His father is Sargent Shriver, the first director of the Peace Corps upon its establishment by President John F. Kennedy on March 1, 1961, a former ambassador to France and the 1972 Democratic Vice Presidential candidate. Mark Shriver has written a memoir about his father, A Good Man: Rediscovering My Father, Sargent Shriver. In 2013, Shriver won a Christopher Award for the book. In 2016, he wrote a second book, Pilgrimage: My Search for the Real Pope Francis.

His sister, Maria Shriver, is a former journalist and the former First Lady of California (she was married to former Governor of California Arnold Schwarzenegger until mid-year 2011). His brother, Bobby Shriver, served as a city council member and mayor of Santa Monica, California.

Shriver attended high school at the Georgetown Preparatory School, North Bethesda, Maryland and graduated in 1982. Afterward, he earned a bachelor's degree from the College of the Holy Cross in 1986, and a master's degree in public administration from Harvard University in 1993.

Shriver's godfather is former professional tennis player Donald Dell.

Career
From 1989 to 1994, he was a member of the Maryland Juvenile Justice Advisory Council. Starting in 1991, he also served on the board of directors of the Public Justice Center. From 1991 to 1992, he served on the Maryland Governor's Task Force on Alternative Sanctions to Incarceration. From 1994 to 1995, he served on the Maryland Governor's Commission on Service.

In 1994, he was elected to the Maryland House of Delegates, the lower house of the Maryland state legislature, representing Montgomery County, Maryland, District 15, and was reelected in 1998. He did not seek reelection in 2002 and was succeeded in that post by Brian Feldman.

In addition to serving as a delegate, he worked on the Task Force on the Maryland Prepaid-Tuition Savings Program in 1996, and on the Task Force to Study the Governance, Coordination, and Funding of the University System of Maryland from 1998 to 1999. He was a Founder and Executive Director of The Choice Program, an at-risk youth intervention project of the Shriver Center at University of Maryland, Baltimore County established in 1987. He then served on the Advisory Board on After-School Opportunity Programs from 1999 to 2003. From 2000 to 2001, he served on the Judith P. Hoyer Blue Ribbon Commission on Early Child Care and Education.

In 2002, he ran for U.S. Representative from the 8th Congressional District of Maryland, but was defeated in the Democratic primary by Chris Van Hollen. Van Hollen received 43.5% of the vote to Shriver's 40.6%.

Shriver joined Save the Children in 2003, serving as Senior Vice President for U.S. Programs until 2013. In that capacity, he created and oversaw the agency's early childhood education, literacy, health, and emergency preparedness and response programs in the United States.

As president of Save the Children Action Network, he is working to build bipartisan political will to increase access to early-childhood education in the United States and to end preventable deaths of mothers and children around the world. Shriver told The Washington Post in 2016: "We're actually engaged in elections, and we're trying to support candidates who are good on [kids'] issues. And we're going to try and defeat those who aren't. So we want to be the NRA for kids. We want to be a movement, but we want to have political juice as well."

In 2021, Shriver became the President of Don Bosco Cristo Rey High School.

Personal life
Mark Shriver is a member of both the Shriver and Kennedy families. On June 26, 1992, Shriver married Jeanne Ripp (born 1965), territory manager for American Express Travel Related Services. Shriver resides in Bethesda, Md., with his wife Jeanne and their three children.

Awards and honors
Honorary Doctorate, La Roche College, 2016.
Honorary Doctorate, Seattle University, 2015.
Honorary Doctorate, Wheelock College, 2013.
Honorary Doctorate, College of the Holy Cross, 2010.
Honorary Doctorate, Loyola College in Maryland, 1994.
Legislative Sponsor Award, Maryland Children's Action Network, 1999, 2000, 2001.
Environmental Leadership Award, Maryland League of Conservation Voters, 1999, 2000, 2001.
Leadership Award, Maryland Alliance of Boys and Girls Clubs, 2001.
Award of Excellence, Mothers Against Drunk Driving, 2002.
Outstanding Legislative Leadership Award, The Arc of Maryland, 2002.
Father of the Year Award, Mother's Day/Father's Day Council, 2008.

References

External links
Curriculum vitae at Maryland legislature
Biography at the Trust for Early Education
Ancestor David Shriver

1964 births
College of the Holy Cross alumni
American people of German descent
American people of Irish descent
Kennedy family
Harvard Kennedy School alumni
Living people
Democratic Party members of the Maryland House of Delegates
People from Potomac, Maryland
People from Washington, D.C.
Shriver family
Georgetown Preparatory School alumni
Catholics from Maryland